Kitamura Hajime (北村甫, 1923–2004) was a Japanese linguist who particularly focused on the Lhasa dialect of Tibetan. He published both a grammar and a dictionary of Lhasa Tibetan. He was employed at the Tokyo University of Foreign Studies at the Institute of Languages and Cultures of Asia and Africa.

Works
Kitamura, Hajime (1960) チベット文字轉寫とチベット語表記
Kitamura, Hajime (1964). Gendai Chibettogo kōgo nyūmon tekisuto (sōan). Yunesuko Higashi Ajia Bunka Kenkyū Sentā, Tōyō Bunko.
Kitamura, Hajime (1969)  『五体清文鑑』 のチベット語について: 中間報告
Kitamura, Hajime (1974). Gendai Chibettogo no hatsuon. (Pronunciation of Modern Tibetan) ILCAA, 1974.
Kitamura, Hajime (1974). Chibetto moji nyumon. (Introduction to Tibetan Scripts) ILCAA, 1974.
Kitamura, Hajime (1974). Gendai Chibettogo no kaiwa. (Conversation of Modern Tibetan) ILCAA, 1974
Kitamura, Hajime (1975). "The Honorifics in Tibetan." Acta Asiatica 29: 56-74.
Kitamura, Hajime (1975) 現代チベット語の研修について (昭和 49 年度言語研修報告)
Kitamura, Hajime (1977). Tibetan: Lhasa Dialect. Tokyo: Asia Africa Gengo Bunka Kenkyūjo, Tokyo Gaikokugo Daigaku.
Kitamura, Hajime (1981) 日本学術振興会言語学訪中団報告
Kitamura, Hajime (1990). 現代チベット語分類辞典

References

1923 births
2004 deaths
Tibetologists
Linguists from Japan
20th-century linguists